Cristian Javier Magaña Leyton (born 26 March 1991) is a Chilean footballer who plays as a defender for Deportes Melipilla.

References

External links
Goal.com Profile

Cristian Magaña at playmakerstats.com (English version of ceroacero.es)

1991 births
Living people
People from Cachapoal Province
Chilean footballers
Chile under-20 international footballers
Chilean Primera División players
Primera B de Chile players
Segunda División Profesional de Chile players
Colo-Colo footballers
Unión San Felipe footballers
Everton de Viña del Mar footballers
Colo-Colo B footballers
Universidad de Concepción footballers
Puerto Montt footballers
Deportes Copiapó footballers
Deportes Melipilla footballers
Lautaro de Buin footballers
Association football defenders